Rhynchopyga bicolor is a species of moth in the subfamily Arctiinae. It is found in Ecuador.

Larvae have been recorded feeding on Peritassa species.

References

Natural History Museum Lepidoptera generic names catalog

Euchromiina